Sheila Christine Scott OBE (nee Hopkins; 27 April 1922 – 20 October 1988) was an English aviator who broke over 100 aviation records through her long distance flight endeavours, which included a  "world and a half" flight in 1971. On this flight, she became the first person to fly over the North Pole in a small aircraft.

Early years
Born Sheila Christine Hopkins in Worcester, Worcestershire, England, she had a turbulent childhood and did not do well at the Alice Ottley School, nearly being expelled several times. During World War II, she joined the services as a nurse in a naval hospital.

Flying
In 1943, she started a career as an actress as Sheila Scott, a name she maintained long after she stopped acting. She had a short marriage from 1945 to 1950 to Rupert Bellamy.

In 1958 she learned to fly going solo at Thruxton Aerodrome after nine months of training. Her first aircraft was a Thruxton Jackaroo (converted Tiger Moth) G-APAM which she owned from 1959 to 1964. In April 1966 she bought her Piper Comanche 260B G-ATOY named Myth Too in which she set ninety world records. Her first solo round the world flight commenced at London Heathrow on 18 May 1966 and returned on 20 June 1966, having covered approximately 31,000 miles (49,890 kilometres) on 189 flying hours in 34 days. In 1969–70 she flew solo around the world in the same aircraft a second time. This aircraft was severely damaged in 1979 (after she sold it in 1971) and the remains are on display in the collection of the National Museum of Flight, East Fortune, East Lothian, Scotland.  She later used a borrowed Piper Comanche 400 N8515P to set more records.

On 20 November 1966, she appeared as a contestant on the American panel show What's My Line. The following year, she appeared as herself on the game show, To Tell the Truth, where she received three of four possible votes.

In 1971 she bought a twin-engined Piper Aztec 250 G-AYTO named Mythre  in which she completed her third solo round the world flight in the same year. This aircraft was destroyed in a flood at the Piper factory in Lock Haven in 1972.

Affiliations
She was the founder, and the first governor, of the British branch of the Ninety-Nines, an association for licensed women pilots, which had been created by Amelia Earhart. She was a member of the International Association of Licensed Women Pilots, and of the Whirly-Girls, an association of women helicopter pilots.

Honours and awards
She was appointed an Officer of the Order of the British Empire (OBE) in 1968. One of the teaching buildings at the University of Worcester is named after her.

In 1967, Scott was awarded (along with three others) the winner of a Harmon International Aviation Trophy for setting a new light plane speed record of 28,633 miles solo in 33 days and 3 minutes. She received the Brabazon of Tara Award in 1965, 1967, 1968. She received the Britannia Trophy of the Royal Aero Club of Britain in 1968, and the Royal Aero Club Gold Medal for 1971.

Death
Before her death, Scott lived in a bedsit in Pimlico in poverty. She was diagnosed with cancer and died at age 66 at the Royal Marsden Hospital, London, in 1988.

References

Sources

1922 births
1988 deaths
Britannia Trophy winners
Deaths from cancer in England
English aviators
Harmon Trophy winners
People from Worcester, England
Officers of the Order of the British Empire
People educated at The Alice Ottley School
British women aviators
British aviation record holders
British women aviation record holders